Kashinath Naik (born 12 May 1983) is an Indian professional javelin thrower.

He won the bronze medal at the 2010 Commonwealth Games with a throw of 74.29 meters. He holds the post of Naib Subedar in the Indian Army.

References

External links
 
 Kashinath Naik profile at All Athletics

People from Uttara Kannada
1983 births
Living people
Indian male javelin throwers
Athletes (track and field) at the 2010 Commonwealth Games
Athletes from Karnataka
Athletes (track and field) at the 2010 Asian Games
Commonwealth Games bronze medallists for India
Commonwealth Games medallists in athletics
Asian Games competitors for India
Medallists at the 2010 Commonwealth Games